Çubuk is a town and district of Ankara Province in the Central Anatolia region of Turkey, outside the city of Ankara. Çubuk is a flat plain 35 km north of the city where Ankara airport is located. According to 2000 census, population of the district is 81,747 of which 76,716 live in the town of Çubuk.

Origin

Çubuk was among the first places that were captured during the conquest of Anatolia by the Seljuk Turks. The district is said to be named after , the Seljuk commander that captured the region. Kışlacık, Yeşilkent, Yaylak, Okçular, Çatköy, and Ahurlar are places located in Çubuk and used by Yıldırım Bayezid during the 1402 Battle of Ankara which was fought between the Ottoman Empire and Timur.

History 

Çubuk is a settlement that was established when the Turks invaded and took control of Anatolia. The district is located in the northeast of Ankara. Çubuk gained historical importance when Bayezid I used Çubuk in the Battle of Ankara which was fought between Timur and the Ottoman Empire.  Most of the villages that make up the district were formed by the remnants of armies defeated or left behind after the major battle.

Çubuk is in an area that has been crossed by trade routes since the Middle Ages. The settlement is thought to have been founded after the conquest of Ankara and was under the control of many civilizations, for example the Hattians, Hittites, Phrygians, Romans, Byzantines, Seljuks, Timurids and Ottomans. This is why the remains of these empires can be found in the district. Ruins in the Balıkhisar Neighborhood, castle ruins in Camili and Çatkoy, a marble lion sculpture in the Güldarpı neighborhood and remains of graves in the Yakup Derviş neighborhood are among the remains of these empires.

It is believed that the Turks settled in the region after they invaded and took control of the Anatolia. The Turks who came to the region brought their families, traditions, customs, and beliefs.

Demographics

Villages

Places of interest
 Karagöl rocks, picnic area

Notes

References
 
 
 
1965-2016 Turkish Statistical Institute . It was archived from its source on April 19, 2020.
“Birsen Edanur Yıldırım - Settlement and Population of Ankara Sanjak in Terms of Historical Geography (1871-1907), Settlements by Salname, Çubukabad Town p.89 - Ankara 2006” .  It was archived from its source on September 21, 2014.  Retrieved March 16, 2012.

External links
 District governor's official website 
 District municipality's official website 

 
Populated places in Ankara Province
Districts of Ankara Province